Joseph Case High School is a public high school located in Swansea, Massachusetts. The school, accredited by the New England Association of Schools and Colleges, hosts grades 9-12 and has a population of over 500 students.

History

Joseph Case High School is named after the father of Elizabeth Richmond Case, a local philanthropist who married Frank Shaw Stevens. In 1927, Case donated funds to create the first high school in Swansea and chose the dedication to her father. In 1950, the architect Israel T. Almy designed the school building.

Case High School, known athletically as the Cardinals, competes within the South Coast Conference of the Massachusetts Interscholastic Athletic Association. Their marching band won both New England and Massachusetts USBands championships in 2014. Five years later, they also were victorious in the New England Scholastic Band Association championship.

Notable alumni
Antone S. Aguiar Jr. (1948), politician
Bob Evans (1990), wrestler
David Leite (1978), writer
David J. Place (1996), politician

See also
List of high schools in Massachusetts

References

External links

Educational institutions established in 1927
Public high schools in Massachusetts
Schools in Bristol County, Massachusetts